Godfathers and Sons is a documentary directed by Marc Levin. The film is part of The Blues, a seven part PBS series, with Martin Scorsese as executive producer.

Synopsis 
Godfathers and Sons follows Producer Marshall Chess as he remembers his father Leonard Chess' contribution to Chicago blues history as the co-founder of Chess Records, and his own production of the controversial album Electric Mud. Chess organizes a reunion of the musicians that made Electric Mud to record new versions of Muddy Waters's blues standard "Mannish Boy," with contributions by hip hop artists, including Chuck D of Public Enemy, Common & Kyle Jason. The film includes never-before-seen archival footage of Howlin' Wolf, Muddy Waters and the Paul Butterfield Blues Band, and original performances by Koko Taylor, Otis Rush, Magic Slim, Ike Turner, and Sam Lay.

Critical reception 
Variety (September 2, 2003): "Bonus is Levin’s technique — he adds a cinema verite take on the city’s contempo club scene to his blues ‘n’ rap story and adds a few B&W clips from the 1960s that make the blues appear regal, vital and thriving. For story and filmmaking technique alone, “Godfathers & Sons” is the crown jewel in the Scorsese series."

References

External links 

 PBS website for The Blues: Godfathers and Sons
 The Blues: Godfathers and Sons on IMDb

2003 documentary films
American documentary films
2003 films
2000s American films